WULF (94.3 FM) is a radio station  broadcasting a country music format.  Licensed to Hardinsburg, Kentucky, United States, the station is currently owned by Skytower Communications - 94.3, LLC and features programming from Premiere Radio Networks and Westwood One.

History
The station went on the air as WHIC-FM on March 23, 1979. Under ownership by Breckinridge County Broadcasting, it was an FM companion for variety-formatted WHIC (AM 1520), which had been on the air since 1968. In 1982, both WHIC AM and FM were acquired by Key Broadcasting, presided by Terry Forcht. 

Both WHIC AM and FM were simulcasting a country music format by 1994. On May 24, 1995, the station changed its call sign to the current WULF.

On-air staff
The Wolf features mornings with Eric Cornish and Jodie Thompson, middays with Trisha Caudill, afternoons with Jimmy Wilson, and nights with Brian Walker.

Translators
In addition to the main station, WULF is relayed by an additional translator to widen its broadcast area.

References

External links

ULF
Radio stations established in 1995
1995 establishments in Kentucky
Breckinridge County, Kentucky